Black Beauty: Miles Davis at Fillmore West is a live double album by American jazz trumpeter, composer, and bandleader Miles Davis. It was recorded on April 10, 1970, at the Fillmore West in San Francisco, shortly after the release of the trumpeter's Bitches Brew album and the recording of Jack Johnson (1971). Black Beauty was produced by Teo Macero, Davis' longtime record producer.

A jazz-rock album, Black Beauty captured one of Davis' first performances at a rock venue during the early stages of his electric period. At the concert, he led his band—saxophonist Steve Grossman, bassist Dave Holland, keyboardist Chick Corea, drummer Jack DeJohnette, and percussionist Airto Moreira—through one continuously performed set list which functioned as a musical suite for soloists to improvise throughout. He signaled changes from one piece to the next with phrases played on his trumpet.

Black Beauty was first released only in Japan by CBS/Sony in 1973 without individual songs specified in the track listing. Columbia Records, Davis' American record label, had difficulty identifying the compositions for royalty purposes, and the album was not released in the United States until 1997. Critics were generally positive toward Black Beauty, although some were critical of its sound quality and Grossman's solos; Corea said the recording was an accurate document how that particular band of Davis' played live.

Background 
Black Beauty was recorded in concert at the Fillmore West in San Francisco on April 10, 1970, when Davis performed as the opening act for the Grateful Dead. The performance took place soon after his studio album Bitches Brew had been released to stores, and he played some songs from the album. Davis led an ensemble that featured soprano saxophonist Steve Grossman, bassist Dave Holland, keyboardist Chick Corea, drummer Jack DeJohnette, and percussionist Airto Moreira. After the departure of saxophonist Wayne Shorter from the group earlier that year, Grossman was enlisted by Davis to participate in an April 7 recording session for his next album Jack Johnson (1971) before joining the live band.

The April 10 show was the second of four concerts Davis played at the Fillmore West that month and one of his first concerts in a rock venue, having performed at New York City's Fillmore East a month earlier. His change to rock venues, suggested by Columbia Records president Clive Davis, helped the label market Bitches Brew to the counterculture audience. According to Holland, the trumpeter's music around this time became well received by the rock audiences they encountered. "I heard quite recently from one of the [Grateful Dead's] ex-members that they were very nervous that they had to play up next to Miles", Holland said. "It was a time when people were not that worried about musical categories. And this was some pretty strong in-your-face music. People loved it." Davis said the Fillmore West shows were an "eye-opening experience" for him. While he became friendly with Grateful Dead frontman Jerry Garcia, who was a fan of Davis' music, there were several thousands of mostly young, white hippies who were generally unfamiliar with him, Davis recalled.

Composition and performance 

The songs in the band's set list were: "Directions", "Miles Runs the Voodoo Down", "Willie Nelson", "I Fall in Love Too Easily", "Sanctuary", "It's About That Time", "Bitches Brew", "Masqualero", "Spanish Key", and "The Theme". They were performed as one continuous and uninterrupted piece of music, a practice Davis had begun in 1967. He later explained in his autobiography that performing these kinds of long musical suites without breaks allowed more space for improvisations in concert.

Most of the band's improvisations on Black Beauty centered around vamps or themes Davis introduced and restated during the performance. According to Davis scholar Paul Tingen, the record is filled with "coded phrases" he played on his trumpet to signify a change from one composition to the next. "The music would be continuous so Miles wouldn't have to speak and announce things to the audience", DeJohnette recalled. "He'd just speak with his horn and just cue the numbers by stating the front part of the melody, and then we automatically knew, which was great, because he wanted it to be a seamless kind of thing." Holland, who played both acoustic and electric bass at the show, elaborated on the tradition of using such musical signals in jazz and their use in Davis' group:

According to Los Angeles Times critic Don Heckman, the resulting textures heard in Black Beautys music exhibited "an almost pointillistic quality, with bits and pieces of sounds darting in and out of the overall texture, and Davis' trumpet skimming through the mix". In Spin, Erik Davis highlighted Grossman's "squonking sax", Corea's "nastily distorted" keyboards, and Davis' "milky, yearning, sometimes angry" trumpet playing. Because they were playing around a preceding vamp or theme when Davis signaled the next, Tingen said the musical shifts heard on the record had the effect of post-production crossfades, similar to those used by producer Teo Macero on the studio recordings In a Silent Way (1969), Bitches Brew, and Jack Johnson. Macero claimed Davis conceived his onstage approach from him: "It was because of me, because we always overlapped sections in our edits."

Some of the songs, including "I Fall in Love Too Easily", "Masqualero", and "The Theme", were from Davis' 1950s and 1960s repertoire. "The Theme" was originally recorded in 1955 by his first great quintet and was used to close most of his concerts from the late 1950s to 1970, after which he began to favor "Sanctuary" as a closing number. "Masqualero" was performed in a similar rock-influenced fashion as the newer material, with DeJohnette and Holland carrying aggressive vamps and Corea playing distorted riffs on his electric piano. John Szwed believed the music paid homage to Davis' past, "respecting space, solos, form, and fixed rhythms, though there are also hints throughout that [the band] will soon find some other way to organize this music to play it live." In Corea's opinion, the record was an accurate document of how this particular band of Davis' played in concert.

Release and reception 
Black Beauty was originally released only in Japan in 1973. It contained four side-long tracks spread across a double album, grouping the songs as medleys titled "Black Beauty Part I", "Black Beauty Part II", and so on, all of which credited Davis as the composer. He did not want the actual segments specified on the track listing out of a distaste for critics and listeners who arduously analyzed his music; according to DeJohnette's wife Lydia, "Miles really felt that critics and people spent too much time in their mental mind, analyzing and talking for hours about something that really just is." Columbia spent several years identifying some of the individual compositions to ensure royalty payment for the actual composers. The Japanese release also mistakenly credited Michael Henderson—Davis' other bassist during this period—rather than Holland in the liner notes.

The record was only available in the United States as an import until 1997, when it was remastered on CD in 20-bit resolution and released by Legacy Recordings as a limited edition digipak. Robert Christgau reviewed the reissue that year in The Village Voice:

Davis biographer Jack Chambers was more critical, finding the sound quality and Grossman's performance poor, especially on the first disc, where he indulged in a "nervous downpour of notes that is narrow in range and unimaginative". In general, Chambers complained that the concert's largely improvised format was risky and inauspicious: "It can inspire creative bridges and emotive playing melded into a spontaneous suite or degenerate into a babble of voices bogged down in search of the musical means to get from one theme to the next." In Tingen's opinion, the quality of the mix was "substandard" and Grossman's solos sounded "nervous and shrill", but he still recommended Black Beauty as "a powerful document of an exciting phase in Miles's electric explorations, when the direction of his live performances was catching up with his studio explorations". Writing for Down Beat, John Corbett found the recording "gritty" but the grooves free and pure-sounding. Sputnikmusic's Hernan M. Campbell was more enthusiastic, deeming it "the perfect live album for not just any fan of Miles Davis, but jazz fans in general".

Track listing 
All compositions were credited to Miles Davis, except where noted.

1973 double LP

Personnel
Credits are adapted from the album's liner notes.

Musicians 
Chick Corea – electric piano
Miles Davis – trumpet
Jack DeJohnette – drums
Steve Grossman – saxophone
Dave Holland – bass
Airto Moreira – percussion

Production 
 Bob Belden – reissue production
 Steve Berkowitz – reissue coordination
 Hope Chasin – art direction
 Chick Corea –  reissue liner notes
 Kevin Gore – reissue coordination
 Teo Macero – production
 Randall Martin – reissue design
 Tadayuki Naitoh – front cover photo
 Seth Rothstein  – reissue executive production
 Tom Ruff – reissue mastering
 Cozbi Sanchez-Cabera – reissue art direction
 Sandy Speiser – liner photos
 Teruhisa Tajima – cover design
 Shuichi Yoshida – cover design

See also 

 1970s in jazz
 Agharta (album)

References

Bibliography

Further reading

External links 
 
 
 

1973 live albums
Albums produced by Teo Macero
Columbia Records albums
Albums recorded at the Fillmore
Live jazz fusion albums
Grateful Dead
Miles Davis live albums
Sony Music Entertainment Japan albums